The Democracy and Solidarity Party, also known by its abbreviation and short name Demos, is a political party of Romania.

History 
The Democracy and Solidarity Party has its origins in the autumn of 2015 according to the party's website, which claims that Demos arose "in response to the need to organize the progressive forces, articulating a strong critique of the underdevelopment, inequality and division of the Romanian society". A manifesto published on 15 September 2016 formally created the political party. It was officially registered as such in 1 September 2018.

Ideology 
Demos declares itself as a left-wing party. It promotes elements such as equal opportunity and poverty reduction and condemns the injustice and the economic and social inequality that it claims to be present in the Romanian society.

The party was critical towards other parties that governed Romania following the Romanian Revolution, most notably the Social Democratic Party (PSD) and National Liberal Party (PNL), which are considered by Demos as responsible for the "enlargement of the economic inequalities and increasing social division" of the country. Demos considers itself the only "real" left-wing party in Romania, opposing the PSD, which Demos members accuse of not being true to the leftist ideology and deem it as "the enemy of the left".

See also 
 Politics of Romania

References

External links 
 

2018 establishments in Romania
Democratic socialist parties in Europe
Feminism in Romania
Feminist parties in Europe
Political parties established in 2018
Pro-European political parties in Romania
Progressive parties
Socialist parties in Romania